Kyra Harris Bolden (born July 31, 1988) is an American judge, politician, and civil litigation attorney. She has served as an associate justice of the Michigan Supreme Court since January 1, 2023. Bolden was a Democratic member of the Michigan House of Representatives for the 35th district from January 1, 2019 to January 1, 2023.

She was a candidate for the Michigan Supreme Court in 2022, but came in third behind incumbents Richard Bernstein and Brian Zahra. On November 22, 2022, Bolden was appointed to the Michigan Supreme Court by Governor Gretchen Whitmer to replace Bridget Mary McCormack.

Bolden was a civil litigation attorney. In her bid for re-election in 2020, Bolden faced Democratic primary challenger Shadia Martini. In the primary, Bolden defeated Martini by 20,981 votes. Bolden went on to be re-elected in the 2020 election, defeating Republican challenger Daniela Davis.

Early life and education 
Kyra Harris Bolden is an attorney, serving her second term, representing her hometown of Southfield in the Michigan State House. A graduate of Southfield Public Schools, Bolden chose to remain in Michigan for her studies, receiving her bachelor's degree from Grand Valley State University and Juris Doctor from the University of Detroit Mercy School of Law.

Career

While working in Lansing, Bolden advocates for Michiganders as a member of the Judiciary Committee and has focused her work on criminal justice reform, crafting and passing bipartisan legislation to protect survivors of sexual violence. Bolden has passed the “Medically Frail” prison reform package, the revision of the Wrongful Imprisonment Compensation Act, and the “Address Confidentiality for Survivors of Domestic Violence” package.

Michigan Supreme Court 

On November 22, 2022, Bolden was appointed to the Michigan Supreme Court by Governor Gretchen Whitmer to replace Bridget Mary McCormack. Bolden is the first Black woman to serve on the Michigan Supreme Court.

Controversies 

In 2023, Michigan Supreme Court Justice Richard H. Bernstein drew controversy after Bolden hired Pete Martel, who spent fourteen years in prison for armed robbery before attending Wayne State University Law School, as a law clerk.  Bernstein publicly stated that he was "completely disgusted" by  Bolden's decision to hire Martel as a law clerk and claimed that he and Justice Bolden "don't share the same values."   He also claimed that Bolden's decision to hire Martel would reflect poorly on the entire court and that it was not "fair to the police and the prosecutors" to have a convicted felon working for the court.  Bolden confirmed that Martel had resigned from his position as a law clerk due to Bernstein's comments and explained that Martel "did not want to be a distraction or in any way divert the court from its important work." On January 9, 2023 Bernstein issued a statement saying he apologized to Bolden in person at the Hall of Justice and that she accepted his apology.

Affiliations 
Bolden has received several awards, including the 2019 Detroit Association of Women's Clubs, Inc. “Young Women Lifting As We Climb Image Award”, 2019 African American Leadership Awards “Emerging Leader Award”, 2020 Michigan Chronicle 40 Under 40 honoree, 2021 Legislative Economic Development Champion Award and the 2021 Michigan Credit Union League “Legislator of the Year” award.

Bolden is a member of the Oakland County Bar Association, Wolverine Bar Association, Straker Bar Association, the Women Lawyers Association of Michigan, National Congress of Black Women-Oakland County, Alpha Kappa Alpha sorority, and as a member of the Total Living Commission for the City of Southfield.

Personal life 
Bolden lives in her hometown of Southfield with her husband, Dr. Greg Bolden, and daughter Emerson Portia Bolden.

See also 
 List of African-American jurists

References

External links 
 Kyra Harris Bolden at housedems.com
 
 Kyra Harris Bolden at votesmart.org

|-

 

 

1988 births
21st-century African-American politicians
21st-century African-American women
21st-century American judges
21st-century American politicians
21st-century American women judges
21st-century American women lawyers
21st-century American lawyers
21st-century American women politicians
African-American state legislators in Michigan
African-American women in politics
Democratic Party members of the Michigan House of Representatives
Grand Valley State University alumni
Justices of the Michigan Supreme Court
Living people
Michigan lawyers
Place of birth missing (living people)
Women state legislators in Michigan